The 1965 season was the 60th season of competitive football in Norway.

1. divisjon

2. divisjon

Group A

Group B

3. divisjon

Group Østland/Søndre

Group Østland/Nordre

Group Sørland/Vestland, A

Group Sørland/Vestland, B

Group Sørland/Vestland, C

Group Møre

Group Trøndelag

District IX

District X

District XI

Play-off Sørland/Vestland 
 October 3: Vard – Baune 1-3
 October 10: Vigør – Vard 0-3
 October 17: Baune – Vigør 4-0

Play-off Møre/Trøndelag 
 October 10: Herd – Falken 3-1
 October 17: Falken – Herd 5-0 (agg. 6-3)

Falken promoted

Northern Norway Championship 
 Kirkenes – Harstad 2-2
 Bodø/Glimt – Kirkenes 2-1
 Harstad – Bodø/Glimt 3-0

4. divisjon

District I

District II, Group A

District II, Group B

District III, Group A (Oplandene)

District III, Group B1 (Sør-Østerdal)

District III, Group B2 (Nord-Østerdal)

District III, Group B3 (Sør-Gudbrandsdal)

District III, Group B4 (Nord-Gudbrandsdal)

District IV, Group A (Vestfold)

District IV, Group B (Grenland)

District IV, Group B (Øvre Telemark)

District V, Group A1 (Aust-Agder)

District V, Group A2 (Vest-Agder)

District V, Group B1 (Rogaland)

District V, Group B2 (Rogaland)

District V, Group C (Sunnhordland)

District VI, Group A (Bergen)

District VI, Group B (Midthordland)

District VI, Group C (Sogn og Fjordane)

District VII, Group A (Sunnmøre)

District VII, Group B (Romsdal)

District VII, Group C (Nordmøre)

District VIII, Group A (Sør-Trøndelag)

District VIII, Group B (Trondheim)

District VIII, Group C (Fosen)

District VIII, Group D (Nord-Trøndelag/Namdal)

District IX

District X

District XI

Play-off District I/IV 
 Askim – Gvarv 5-0
 Urædd – Halsen 3-1
 Halsen – Askim 2-4
 Gvarv – Urædd 1-0
 Askim – Urædd 6-2
 Gvarv – Halsen 6-1

Play-off District II/III 
 Nordre Trysil – Brekken 2-0
 Sel – Faaberg 2-4
 Faaberg – Nordre Trysil 0-1
 Nordre Trysil – Moelven 2-4
 Kongsvinger – Slemmestad 1-0
 Moelven – Kongsvinger 1-1
 Slemmestad – Nordre Trysil 5-1
 Moelven – Slemmestad 0-0
 Kongsvinger – Nordre Trysil 2-0

Play-off District V 
 Randaberg – Vidar 3-1
 Vidar – Randaberg 1-2 (agg. 2-5)

Randaberg promoted
 Vidar – Fonna 4-0 (in Kopervik)

Vidar promoted

Championship District V 
 Øyestad – Mandalskameratene 4-0
 Mandalskameratene – Øyestad (not played)

Play-off District VI 
 Sandviken – Sandane 3-2
 Sandane – Voss 2-1
 Voss – Sandviken 1-2

Play-off District VII 
 Velledalen/Ringen – Eidsvåg 1-1
 Eidsvåg – Braatt 1-5
 Braatt – Velledalen/Ringen 1-5

Play-off District VIII 
 Freidig – Brekstad 4-2
 Rindal – Stjørdals/Blink 1-4
 Brekstad – Stjørdals/Blink 1-2
 Freidig – Rindal 1-2
 Stjørdals/Blink – Freidig 2-3
 Rindal – Brekstad 2-1

Norwegian Cup

Final 

Replay

Second replay

Northern Norwegian Cup

Final

European Cups

Norwegian representatives 
 Lyn (Champions Cup)
 Rosenborg (Cup Winners Cup)
 Vålerengen (Fairs Cup)

Champions Cup

First round
August 31: Lyn – Derry City (Northern Ireland) 5–3

September 9: Derry City – Lyn 5–1 (agg. 8–6)

Cup Winners' Cup

First round
August 24: KR Reykjavik (Iceland) – Rosenborg 1–3

September 12: Rosenborg – KR Reykjavik 3–1 (agg. 6–2)

Second round
October 24: Rosenborg – Dinamo Kiev (Soviet Union) 1–4

October 28: Dinamo Kiev – Rosenborg 2–0 (agg. 6–1)

Fairs Cup

First round
Vålerengen had a walkover.

Second round
October 18: Hearts (Scotland) – Vålerengen 1–0

October 27: Vålerengen – Hearts 1–3 (agg. 1–4)

National team 

Note: Norway's goals first 
Explanation:
 F = Friendly
 WCQ = World Cup Qualifier

 
Seasons in Norwegian football